David Hobson may refer to:
 Dave Hobson (born 1936), American politician of the Republican party
 David Hobson (tenor), Australian opera / musical singer